Alice is a thematic television channel, dedicated to cooking. The broadcasts began in 2013, both on the satellite.

See also
Daniele Persegani
Alice TV

Notes

External links
 Official website

Television channels and stations established in 2013